Ruth Chapman (born ) is a New Zealand unionist and Labour Party worker. She was the president of the Post Primary Teachers' Association in the late 1980s and led negotiations with the State Services Commission over teachers' pay and conditions.

Chapman is the convenor of Southern Labour, which represents the five southern general electorate seats as well as Te Tai Tonga.

References

Living people
Year of birth missing (living people)
Women trade union leaders
New Zealand trade union leaders
1950s births
New Zealand Labour Party politicians